Kirsten Andrea Fisher-Marsters (born 11 February 1998) is a Cook Islands swimmer. She competed in the women's 100 metre breaststroke at the 2020 Summer Olympics.

Born in New Zealand, she is able to represent the Cook Islands through her father.

References

External links
 

1998 births
Living people
Cook Island female swimmers
Olympic swimmers of the Cook Islands
Swimmers at the 2020 Summer Olympics
New Zealand sportspeople of Cook Island descent
New Zealand female swimmers
Swimmers from Auckland
Commonwealth Games competitors for the Cook Islands
Swimmers at the 2018 Commonwealth Games
Swimmers at the 2022 Commonwealth Games